The discography of American singer-songwriter Vanessa Carlton consists of six studio albums and 16 singles.

Albums

Studio albums

Compilation albums

Live albums

Extended plays

Singles

As lead artist

As featured artist

Collaborations

B-sides

Other contributions

Music videos

References

Pop music discographies
Rock music discographies
Discographies of American artists